Margaret Coomber (née MacSherry; born 13 June 1950) is a British middle-distance runner. She competed in the women's 800 metres at the 1972 Summer Olympics.

References

1950 births
Living people
Athletes (track and field) at the 1970 British Commonwealth Games
Athletes (track and field) at the 1972 Summer Olympics
Athletes (track and field) at the 1974 British Commonwealth Games
Athletes (track and field) at the 1978 Commonwealth Games
British female middle-distance runners
Olympic athletes of Great Britain
Sportspeople from Dartford
Commonwealth Games competitors for Scotland
Scottish female middle-distance runners
Anglo-Scots